Daniel Alexander Sutherland (April 17, 1869 – March 24, 1955), nicknamed "Fighting Dan", was an American businessperson and politician who served in the United States House of Representatives during the 1920s as the delegate from what was then the Alaska Territory.

Sutherland was born in Pleasant Bay, Nova Scotia on Cape Breton Island in Canada. He moved with his parents to Essex in the U.S. state of Massachusetts in 1876, where he attended the public schools. He was later employed as a grocer's clerk, and subsequently engaged in the fish business.

Sutherland moved to Circle City, Alaska in 1898. When gold was discovered in the sands of Nome in 1900 he moved across the territory and became a prospector eventually becoming a co-owner of a mining company. In 1909, he moved to Juneau.

After a campaign that crossed the Alaska by dog sled, he was elected to the first territorial senate from 1912 to 1920, serving as its president in 1915. During World War I he enrolled in the United States Naval Reserve. He was very popular, and was elected as a Republican to the 67th, 68th, 69th, 70th, and 71st Congresses, serving from March 4, 1921, to March 3, 1931. He earned his nickname for his combative style on Capitol Hill. He was not a candidate for renomination in 1930.

Sutherland supported home rule for the territory, and wanted to break Alaska's dependence on shipping companies based out of the West Coast. He also promoted aircraft as a way to deliver mail and needed supplies across the Alaska Bush and Interior during the winter months, when they were inaccessible by steamship, roads, or most other forms of transportation. He lobbied for the first experimental flights by the U.S. Post Office, which were carried out in February 1924, and when a diphtheria epidemic struck Nome in 1925, he supported an air rescue. Governor Scott Bone ultimately decided to use a dog sled relay in what became known as the 1925 serum run to Nome, but in the 1930s aircraft did replace the dog sled as the primary form of transportation.

After his ten years as a delegate, Sutherland was a purchasing agent for the Ogontz School in the state of Pennsylvania from 1931 to 1950. He died in Abington on March 24, 1955, and his remains were cremated and deposited in St. Paul's Church Cemetery in Elkins Park, Pennsylvania.

References
 Gay Salisbury and Laney Salisbury (2003). The Cruelest Miles: The Heroic Story of Dogs and Men in a Race against an Epidemic. W.W. Norton & Company, Inc. .

External links

 Dan Sutherland at 100 Years of Alaska's Legislature

1869 births
1955 deaths
American military personnel of World War I
Delegates to the United States House of Representatives from Alaska Territory
Republican Party members of the United States House of Representatives from Alaska
Members of the Alaska Territorial Legislature
20th-century American politicians
People from Inverness County, Nova Scotia
Politicians from Juneau, Alaska
People from Nome, Alaska
Presidents of the Alaska Senate
Republican Party Alaska state senators
United States Navy sailors
United States Navy reservists